Feast on Scraps is an Alanis Morissette CD/DVD package released on December 10, 2002. The DVD was filmed during a concert in Rotterdam, Netherlands and the CD contains B-sides and unreleased studio tracks left off Morissette's album Under Rug Swept, which was released earlier that year. "Awakening Americans" and "Symptoms" were the only previously released songs to be omitted.

A promotional-only double A-side of "Simple Together" and "Bent for U" was released in Europe, and "Offer" was released in Brazil, becoming very popular because at the time she appeared in a famous soap opera called Celebridade (Celebrity).

"Simple Together" charted at No. 14 on Chile Top 20.
"Fear Of Bliss" peak at No. 4 on the Digital Sales Top 100 chart.
As of September 2008, Feast on Scraps had sold 76,000 copies in the United States according to Nielsen SoundScan.

Track listing

Personnel
 Alanis Morissette –  guitars, keyboards, vocals
 Nick Lashley –  guitars
 Chris Chaney –  bass
 Joel Shearer –  guitars
 Gary Novak –  drums
 Tim Thorney –  guitars and bass
 Jamie Muhoberac –  keyboards
 Meshell Ndegeocello –  bass on "Bent For You"
 Eric Avery –  bass on "Fear of Bliss"
 Dean DeLeo –  guitar on "Fear of Bliss" and "Unprodigal Daughter"
 Zac Rae –  keyboards on "Sister Blister"
 Richard Causon –  piano on "Simple Together"
 Suzie Katayama –  conductor/arranger on "Simple Together"
 Charlie Bisharat –  violin on "Simple Together"
 Larry Corbett and Rudy Stein –  cello on "Simple Together"
 Blair Sinta –  drums on live footage

Certifications

Release history

Notes

Alanis Morissette albums
Alanis Morissette video albums
Documentary films about pop music and musicians
B-side compilation albums
2002 live albums
Live video albums
2002 video albums
2002 compilation albums
Maverick Records live albums
Maverick Records video albums